Redlands was a settlement in Newfoundland and Labrador, on the Bay de Verde peninsula near its northern tip.  It survived into the second half of the twentieth century with a dwindling population.  Most of the population gradually moved to Low Point (settlement) and other, nearby places.

Populated places in Newfoundland and Labrador